Abdul Kader ( – 26 December 2020) was a Bangladeshi actor. He was best known for his Bodi role in the television drama serial Kothao Keu Nei. He was also popular for his appearance in the popular Bangladeshi magazine show Ityadi.

Early life 
Kader started acting after graduating from school. He acted in Rabindranath Tagore's Dakghar as Amal. During 1972–84, for three consecutive years he was the Drama Secretary of the Mohsin Hall Chhatra Sangsad of University of Dhaka. In the Inter-hall Drama Competition in 1982, he became champion and won an award for his performance for Mohsin Hall's play. He also won award for his play in Jaundice O Bibidho Baloon written by Selim Al Deen and directed by Nasiruddin Yousuff.

Kader was a member of the executive council of Daksu Natyachakra till 1975. He was a member of the Theater Natyagasthi since 1983 and was also the joint editor for four years and the general secretary for six years.

Career 
Kader's professional career began with teaching. He taught economics at Singair Government College and Louhajang College. After that, worked as an executive in Bitopi Advertising Ltd. He has also been the head of merchandising and retail marketing of multinational footwear and fashion accessory manufacturer and retailer Bata Bangladesh since 1989. He was there for 35 years.

Kader started acting in television from 1982 and radio drama from 1983. Kader's first serial drama on television was Esho Galper Deshe. Kader served as the Vice President of the TV Drama Artiste and Playwright's Association (TENASHINAS) for a long time. He was a regular performer on popular magazine shows. Abdul Kader was popular in dramas, advertisements and films. He became known for his role as Bodi in the serial drama Kothao Keu Nei directed by Mohammad Barkatullah and written by Humayun Ahmed. After that  he would work with Ahmed again in Nokkhotrer Raat. Besides acting, Kader also acted in several commercials.

Personal life 
Kader was born in 1950/51 in the village Sonarang of Tongibari Upazila, Munshiganj District to Abdul Jalil and Anwara Khatun. He was married to Khairun Nesa.

Works

Theatre plays 
Kader acted in more than a thousand theater works of about 30 productions in his life. Some of his notable plays are:

 Payer Awaz Pawa Jay
 Ekhono Kritodash
 Tomari
 Spordha
 Dui Bon
 Meraj Fokirer Ma

Television plays 
Kader acted in more than two thousand plays on television. His notable TV plays are:

Filmography 

 Wrong Number
 Bhalobasha Zindabad (2013)

Awards 
 TENASHINAS Award
 Mahanagari Sanskritik Gosthi Award
 Magician PC Sorcar Award
 Television Audience Forum Award

Death 
Kader died of cancer on December 26, 2020 while undergoing treatment at Evercare Hospital in Dhaka. He was admitted to the hospital on December 20 after returning from treatment at Christian Medical College Vellore, where he remained until his death.

References

External links 
 
 
 
 

1950s births
2020 deaths
People from Munshiganj District
University of Dhaka alumni
Bangladeshi actors
Date of birth missing